Irena Pavlovic (born 28 September 1988) is a French former tennis player of Serbian descent. Born in Serbian capital Belgrade, she moved to Paris when she was three.

Pavlovic won four singles and 14 doubles events organized by the International Tennis Federation. Her highest WTA rankings were No. 138 in singles and 107 in doubles.

She was awarded with wildcards for two WTA Tour tournaments in 2009, the Internationaux de Strasbourg and French Open, which was her first Grand Slam appearance. Pavlovic lost in the first round both times to Kristina Barrois and Akgul Amanmuradova, respectively. In her career, she defeated players such as Monica Niculescu, Anne Keothavong and Marina Eraković.

Early and personal life
Pavlovic who was born in Belgrade (SFR Yugoslavia then) to Dragan and Mirjana has a brother, Filip, who was a basketball player. Russian tennis player Arina Rodionova is a good friend of Pavlovic, who began playing tennis aged four, with Monica Seles as her idol. Upon being coached by Christophe Serriere and Danyel Ristic, she was coached at famous academy of Patrick Mouratoglou.

Grand Slam performance timelines

Singles

ITF Circuit finals

Singles: 14 (4 titles, 10 runner-ups)

Doubles: 23 (14 titles, 9 runner-ups)

References

External links
 
 

1988 births
French female tennis players
French people of Serbian descent
Living people
Serbian emigrants to France
Tennis players from Belgrade
Tennis players from Paris